Among those who were born in the London Borough of Barnet, or have dwelt within the border of the modern borough are (alphabetical order, within category):

Notable residents

Academia and research

Arts and entertainment

Crime
 Owen Suffolk – Australian transported convict and   bushranger (born in Finchley in c.1830)

Design
 Harry Beck – designer of the original Tube map

Travel and exploration

Judiciary
 Sir William Shee, the first Roman Catholic judge to sit in England and Wales since the Reformation

Literature

Journalism and the media

Politics and government

Sport and games

References

Barnet
People from the London Borough of Barnet